Maple Bay may refer to:

Maple Bay, British Columbia, Canada
Maple Bay, Minnesota, United States